A hot dog stand is a business that sells hot dogs, usually from an external counter.  Hot dog stands can be located on a public thoroughfare, near a sports stadium, in a shopping mall, or at a fair.  They are often found on the streets of major American cities. According to one report, some hot dog stands are paying up to $80,000 in rent for prime locations in Manhattan.

Similar businesses include hot dog carts or wagons, which are portable hand carts with a grill or boiler for cooking the hot dogs and keeping them hot.  In the United States, hot dog carts are also referred to as hot dog stands.  However, a hot dog stand is typically a permanent or semi-permanent structure, whereas a hot dog cart is movable.  Similarly, hot dog trucks are motor vehicles that are set up at a roadside location, and often include a complete kitchen for storage and preparation. 
	
In Denmark, hot dog stands are called Pølsevogn (sausage wagons). They serve traditional hot dogs as well as assorted sausages and sausage meats.
	
In Toronto, the hot dogs from hot dog stands are often called "street meat".

Windows 3.1 included a red and yellow desktop colour setting titled "Hot Dog Stand".

Notable stands 
	
Art's Famous Chili Dog Stand, Los Angeles, CA
Bæjarins Beztu Pylsur, Reykjavík, Iceland
Ben's Chili Bowl, Washington, DC
Coney Island Colorado, Bailey, CO
Dog n Suds, Grayslake, IL
Essie's Original Hot Dog Shop, Pittsburgh, PA
Gene & Jude's, River Grove, IL
Gray's Papaya, Manhattan, NY
Hillbilly Hot Dogs, Huntington, WV
Hot Dog on a Stick, Santa Monica, CA
Nathan's Famous, Coney Island, NY
Papaya King, Manhattan, NY
Rutt's Hut, Clifton, NJ
Superdawg, Chicago, IL
Tail o' the Pup, Los Angeles, CA
The Varsity, Atlanta, GA
Walter's Hot Dog Stand, Mamaroneck, NY
Weenie Beenie, Arlington, VA
The Wieners Circle, Chicago, IL

Image gallery

See also

 Hot dog cart
 Hot dog variations
 List of hot dog restaurants
 Taco stand

References

 
Street food